Astelena is a genus of sea snails, marine gastropod mollusks in the family Calliostomatidae within the superfamily Trochoidea, the top snails, turban snails and their allies.

Notes
Additional information regarding this genus:
 : Some authors use Astelena Iredale, 1924 as a subgenus in Astele Swainson, 1855 or Calliostoma (Astelena) Iredale, T., 1924

Species

 Astelena multigranum (Dunker, R.W., 1871): synonym of Astele multigranus (Dunker, 1871)
 Astelena scitulum (Adams, A. in Adams, H.G. & A. Adams, 1854): synonym of Astele scitula (A. Adams, 1854)

References

External links
 To World Register of Marine Species

Calliostomatidae